Makan Hislop (born 3 September 1985) is a Trinidad and Tobago football (soccer) player, who plays for United Petrotrin of the TT Pro League.

Career
Before playing professionally in Trinidad, Hislop played for four years at the University of South Carolina in Columbia under the legendary coach Mark Berson; for two of those years a teammate was U.S. goalkeeper Brad Guzan.

International career
Hislop has made 21 appearances for the Trinidad and Tobago national football team.

Personal
He is the cousin of goalkeeper Shaka Hislop.

References

External links

1985 births
Living people
Trinidad and Tobago footballers
TT Pro League players
South Carolina Gamecocks men's soccer players
People from Tobago
Association football defenders
Trinidad and Tobago international footballers